Gymnosporia buxifolia is a species of plant in the family Celastraceae native to southern Africa. It is commonly known as the pioneer spike-thorn or common spike-thorn.

Description 
Gymnosporia buxifolia is a variable evergreen shrub or tree.

Morphology 
Gymnosporia buxifolia grows up to 9 metres tall. It has light brown bark that darkens with age, eventually becoming flakey, rough, corky and fissured. It may be unarmed or armed with long straight spines. The leaves are green, slightly paler on underside, glabrous, often borne clustered on very short dwarf spur-branchlets in the axils of the spines or infrequently on young spines or arranged spirally on new growth. The leaves are variable in shape, but typically narrowly obovate to oblanceolate, 25mm to 45mm long and 10mm to 25mm wide with a toothed margin, usually on the upper half of the leaf, sometimes emarginate. Flowers are borne in heads, small, white with strong odour. The fruit is a more or less spherical, 3 lobed capsule, about 10mm diameter, green-yellow becoming grey-brown and wrinkled when dry. It grows in forests, scrub, grassland, woodland and riverine habitats.

Gallery

Conservation 
It is listed as Least Concern in the Redlist of South African Plants.

References 

buxifolia
Flora of South Africa